Macroglossum avicula is a moth of the  family Sphingidae. It is known from Indonesia (including Sumatra and Java).

References

Macroglossum
Moths described in 1875
Moths of Asia